Liga 1 season 2018 is the first season for Persebaya Surabaya after being re-accepted as a member of PSSI, in 2017 Persebaya play in League 2 and successfully become champion.

Players

Current squad

Starting XI

4-3-3

Transfer

Out

Samuel Reimas
Rangga Muslim
Taufan Hidayat
Mei Handoko
Nerius Alom
Abdul Azis
Said Mardjan
Rahmat Juliandri
Kurniawan Karman
Yogi Novrian
Sidik Saimima
Arthur Irawan
Reky Rahayu

Pre-season and friendlies

At the beginning of the season 2018 Persebaya preceded by following the pre-season event that is president cup and a friendly match against Sarawak FA from Malaysia.

President's Cup

In this President's Cup 2018 group stages, Persebaya is in group (C) using home match system and Persebaya lucky was chosen as the host.

Group Stage

 All matches played in Surabaya, East Java
 Times listed are local (UTC+7:00)

Matches

Knockout Stage

Persebaya stalled in the knockout stage because lost against PSMS Medan through a penalty kicks.

Blessing Game

Persebaya invite Sarawak FA, Malaysia for friendlies titled  Blessing game, this friendly match aims to be grateful because Persebaya successfully become Liga 2 champion and promotion to Liga 1.

Liga 1

League table

Results summary

Results by matchday

Matches
Match listing:

Indonesian Cup

Matches

Squad statistics

Squad & Appearances

References
https://amunisinews.co.id/wali-kota-eri-dukung-persebaya-berlaga-di-liga-1/https://amunisinews.co.id/wali-kota-eri-dukung-persebaya-berlaga-di-liga-1/

https://amunisinews.co.id/wali-kota-eri-dukung-persebaya-berlaga-di-liga-1/

Persebaya Surabaya
Indonesian football clubs 2018 season